Brad Treliving (born August 18, 1969) is a Canadian former professional ice hockey defenceman, and current general manager for the Calgary Flames of the National Hockey League (NHL). 

In 1996, Treliving co-founded the Western Professional Hockey League (WPHL), and he performed an integral role in the 2001 merger of the Central Hockey League (CHL) and WPHL. In 2003, he became assistant general manager of the Phoenix Coyotes under Don Maloney, while also serving as the GM for the team's American Hockey League affiliate, the San Antonio Rampage. He held both positions until April 28, 2014, when the Calgary Flames hired Treliving to be the new general manager of the Flames.

He is the son of Canadian businessman Jim Treliving.

Career statistics

References

External links

1969 births
Living people
Arizona Coyotes executives
Calgary Flames general managers
Canadian expatriate ice hockey players in the United States
Canadian ice hockey coaches
Canadian ice hockey defencemen
Charlotte Checkers (1993–2010) players
Columbus Chill players
Greensboro Monarchs players
Ice hockey people from British Columbia
Indianapolis Ice players
Ladner Penguins players
Louisville Icehawks players
New Haven Senators players
Penticton Knights players
Portland Winterhawks players
Prince Edward Island Senators players
Regina Pats players
Spokane Chiefs players
Sportspeople from Penticton
Winston-Salem Thunderbirds players